Gareth Stevens, Inc. is a publishing company originally based in Milwaukee, Wisconsin. It was founded in 1983 by its namesake owner. The company was owned by Weekly Reader Corporation, part of The Reader's Digest Association. In 2009, it was sold to company chief Gary Spears and Roger Rosen of Rosen Publishing.

Gareth Stevens largely specialises in children's non-fiction reference. Along with its main arm, Gareth Stevens Publishing, its imprints include Weekly Reader Early Imprint Library and World Almamac Library.

In 1991 and 1992, it published the English version of the first seven Beechwood Bunny Tales by Geneviève Huriet. The translators were Mary Lee Knowlton, Amy Bauman and Patricia Lantier-Sampon.

References

External links
Official site

Children's book publishers
Companies established in 1983
Book publishing companies of the United States
Companies based in Milwaukee